Musgrave is a surname originating in the former county of Westmorland, now part of Cumbria in Northern England, where there are two villages called Great Musgrave and Little Musgrave. Notable people with the surname include:

Alan Musgrave, philosopher and academic
Andrew Musgrave, British cross-country skier
Anthony Musgrave, British colonial administrator
Anthony Musgrave (entomologist), great-nephew of the above
Bill Musgrave (born 1967), American football coach and former player
Charles Musgrave is an American chemist in the field of nanotechnology
Christopher Musgrave (disambiguation), multiple people
Harrison Musgrave, American baseball player
Henry Musgrave, Victorian philanthropist, Northern Ireland
Sir James Musgrave, 1st Baronet, 19th-century businessman
Joe Musgrave (1908–1981), English footballer
John Musgrave, an American Vietnam veteran, poet, counselor, and veterans' affairs advocate
John Musgrave (cricketer), (1845–1885), English cricketer
Ken Musgrave, professor and CEO/CTO of Pandromeda, Inc.
Luke Musgrave (born 2000), American football player
Mandy Musgrave, American actress 
Marilyn Musgrave, American politician
Philip Musgrave (disambiguation), multiple people
Richard Musgrave (economist)
Rosamund "Posy" Musgrave, British former cross-country skier
Samuel Musgrave, English classical scholar and physician
Simon Musgrave, (died 1597), English landowner
Susan Musgrave, Canadian poet 
Story Musgrave, NASA Astronaut
Ted Musgrave, NASCAR Driver
Thea Musgrave, Scottish-American composer
Thomas Musgrave (disambiguation), multiple people

See also

Musgrove (surname)